Methanoculleus hydrogenitrophicus is a methanogen.

References

Further reading
Schaechter, Moselio. Encyclopedia of microbiology. Academic Press, 2009.
Horikoshi, Koki, ed. Extremophiles Handbook:... Vol. 1. Springer, 2011.

External links
LPSN
Type strain of Methanoculleus hydrogenitrophicus at BacDive -  the Bacterial Diversity Metadatabase

Euryarchaeota
Archaea described in 2010